Peter Grummitt (born 19 August 1942) is an English footballer who played as a goalkeeper in the Football League during the 1960s and 1970s, most notably with Nottingham Forest.

He made 352 senior appearances for Forest before transferring to Sheffield Wednesday in 1970.

During his time with Wednesday he made 130 senior appearances, and missed just one game during the 1970-71 season. In April 1973 he played his last game for Wednesday, before joining Brighton and Hove Albion, then managed by Brian Clough on loan after Brighton had been beaten 8-2 by Bristol Rovers in front of the TV cameras. However, despite losing 4-1 on his debut against Tranmere Rovers Grummitt made over 100 league appearances for the Seagulls before joining Worthing F.C.

He was capped on three occasions by England under-23 between 1961 and 1963.

References 

English footballers
England under-23 international footballers
Association football goalkeepers
English Football League players
Bourne Town F.C. players
Nottingham Forest F.C. players
Sheffield Wednesday F.C. players
Brighton & Hove Albion F.C. players
Worthing F.C. players
1942 births
Living people
English Football League representative players